A Million Miles Away or Million Miles Away may refer to:
 "Million Miles Away" (Hanoi Rocks song), from their 1984 album Two Steps from the Move
 "Million Miles Away" (Kim Wilde song), from her 1992 album Love Is
 "Million Miles Away" (The Offspring song), from their 2000 album Conspiracy of One
 A Million Miles Away (album), a 1998 compilation album
 "A Million Miles Away", a song by Rory Gallagher, from his 1973 album Tattoo
 "A Million Miles Away", a song by Stiv Bators, from his 1980 solo album Disconnected
 "A Million Miles Away", a song by Toto, from their 1981 album Turn Back
 "A Million Miles Away", a song by Klaatu, from their 1981 album Magentalane
 "A Million Miles Away", a song by The Plimsouls, from their 1983 album Everywhere at Once
 "A Million Miles Away", a song by David Byrne, from his 1992 album Uh-Oh
 "A Million Miles Away", a song by The Rainmakers, from their 1996 album Skin
 "A Million Miles Away", a song by Jim Boyd on the 1998 soundtrack of Smoke Signals (film)
 "A Million Miles Away", a song by Lenny Kravitz, from his 2001 album Lenny
 "Million Miles Away", a song by Espen Lind, from his 2005 album April
 "A Million Miles Away", a song by Rihanna from her 2006 album A Girl Like Me
 "A Million Miles Away", a song by Jann Arden, from her 2009 album Free
 "A Million Miles Away", a song by Alan Menken & Chad Beguelin, from the 2011 musical adaptation of Disney's  Aladdin
 “Million Miles Away”, a song by Keegan Allen, released in 2017